Moorfields Eye Hospital is a specialist NHS eye hospital in Finsbury in the London Borough of Islington in London, England run by Moorfields Eye Hospital NHS Foundation Trust. Together with the UCL Institute of Ophthalmology, which is adjacent to the hospital, it is the oldest and largest centre for ophthalmic treatment, teaching and research in Europe.

History
Moorfields Eye Hospital was founded at Charterhouse Square in 1805 as the London Dispensary for curing diseases of the Eye and Ear, by John Cunningham Saunders, assisted by John Richard Farre. It moved to a site on the former Moorfields in 1822, before moving to its present site in 1899, and became part of the National Health Service in 1948. These anniversaries gave it the unique ability to celebrate a centenary in 1999 and a bicentenary in 2005.

In February 2007, the new Richard Desmond Children's Eye Centre (RDCEC), was opened by the Queen.  Its location is adjacent to the hospital's main City Road building.

In December 2021, it was announced that the hospital will relocate to a new facility near King's Cross railway station and the Moorfields building had been sold to private developers.

Teaching and research
Moorfields Eye Hospital is a major centre for postgraduate training of ophthalmologists, orthoptists, optometrists, and nurses.  It has also played a pivotal role in ophthalmic research.  Sir Stewart Duke-Elder founded the Institute of Ophthalmology (now an integral part of University College London), and Sir Harold Ridley, Charles Schepens, and Norman Ashton have carried out research at Moorfields and the Institute.

Fundraising and associated charities
Founded in 1963, The Friends of Moorfields Charity is an independent registered charity, raising funds for the benefit of the patients of Moorfields Eye Hospital. The primary aim of this charity is to provide supplementary services and equipment for the comfort and well-being of Moorfields' patients and their visitors. It contributes towards buying much needed technical items for professional use in the hospital's clinics, satellite centres, operating theatres and research laboratories. The charity also promotes and manages a wide range of volunteers, supporting the work and service of the hospital.
 
Moorfields Eye Charity is an independent registered charity for Moorfields Eye Hospital. Moorfields Eye Charity raises funds, above and beyond those normally provided by the NHS, to support and promote the work and research of Moorfields Eye Hospital, for the benefit of patients and staff, by raising extra funds to enhance services, research, equipment and facilities including a major joint  – Moorfields and Institute of Ophthalmology, UCL  – new building project.
 
The Special Trustees of Moorfields Eye Hospital (charity number 228064) is a grant-giving body, which primarily supports research carried out at the hospital and research partners at the UCL Institute of Ophthalmology, alongside a range of other projects.

Notable people who worked or studied at Moorfields 
 Selig Percy Amoils (1933), South African ophthalmologist and biomedical engineering inventor
 Eric Arnott (1929–2011), British ophthalmologist and surgeon
 Vivian Balakrishnan (1961), Singapore Minister of Foreign Affairs
 Alan C. Bird (1938), English ophthalmologist
 Geoffrey Bridgeman, British soldier and ophthalmologist
 John Dalrymple (1803–1852), English ophthalmologist
 James Hamilton Doggart (1900–1989), leading British ophthalmologist
 Frank Flynn (1906–2000), Northern Territory-based Australian doctor (ophthalmologist), author and missionary priest
 Frederick T. Fraunfelder (1934), American ophthalmologist
 Norman Gregg (1892–1966), Australian ophthalmologist
 Robert Marcus Gunn (1850–1909), Scottish ophthalmologist
 Michael B. Gorin, American ophthalmologist
 William Hancock (1873–1910), English ophthalmologist
 Henry Bendelack Hewetson (1850–1899), ophthalmic and Aural surgeon
 Fred Hollows (1929–1993), New Zealand-Australian ophthalmologist
 Keith Martin, British ophthalmologist
 Gordon Morgan Holmes (1876–1965), British neurologist
 Ulrich Meyer-Bothling, English ophthalmic surgeon
 Edward Nettleship (1845–1913), English ophthalmologist
 Charles Conor O'Malley (1889–1982), Irish eye surgeon
 James Hogarth Pringle (1863–1941), Scottish surgeon
 Dan Reinstein (1962), ophthalmologist
 Harold Ridley (1906–2001), English ophthalmologist
 Geoffrey Rose (1955), English ophthalmologist
 Charles Schepens (1912–2006), Belgian (later American) ophthalmologist
 Ċensu Tabone (1913–2012), fourth President of Malta
 James Taylor (1u59-1946), British neurologist
 William Taylor (1912–1989), Scottish ophthalmologist
 Edward Treacher Collins (1862–1932), English surgeon and ophthalmologist
 Clive Warren, radio presenter
 Claud Worth, ophthalmologist; known for "Worth's squint"

See also 
 Healthcare in London
 List of hospitals in England

Notes

External links 
 Trust website
 Moorfields Eye Hospital on the NHS website
 Care Quality Commission inspection reports
 Moorfields Eye Hospital UAE Official Site
 Moorfields Private Patients Official Site

NHS hospitals in London
Health in the London Borough of Islington
Buildings and structures in the London Borough of Islington
Eye hospitals in the United Kingdom
1805 establishments in England
Specialist hospitals in England
Hospitals established in 1805
Voluntary hospitals